Helophilus affinis is a European hoverfly.

References

Diptera of Europe
Eristalinae
Insects described in 1844
Taxa named by Peter Fredrik Wahlberg